The 1963 NASCAR Grand National Series was an American stock car racing competition. It was the fourteenth running of what is now called the NASCAR Cup Series.

The series was won by Joe Weatherly from Richard Petty and Fred Lorenzen.

Schedule

Races

Daytona 500

The 1963 Daytona 500 was won by Tiny Lund driving a 1963 Ford.  Lund drove his number 21 to victory in three hours and 17 minutes. Lund, who was driving for Wood Brothers Racing, filled in for Marvin Panch who was suffering from injuries after a fiery crash.

 21 - Tiny Lund
 28 - Fred Lorenzen
 11 - Ned Jarrett
 29 - Nelson Stacy
 0 - Dan Gurney
 43 - Richard Petty
 7A - Bobby Johns
 8 - Joe Weatherly
 13 - Johnny Rutherford
 44 - Tommy Irwin

Pickens 200

The 1963 Pickens 200 was a NASCAR Grand National Series racing event that took place on July 30, 1963, at Greenville-Pickens Speedway (Greenville, South Carolina).

Three lead changes ended up circulating amongst three different race leaders. This racing event took place on a dirt track oval with 200 laps being the pre-determined number of laps according to the NASCAR officials who sanctioned the event.
J. D. McDuffie would crash into the wall on his first lap in his 1961 Ford Galaxie vehicle; causing him to become the last-place finisher of the race.

Frank Warren would make his NASCAR debut racing against Buck Baker, Neil Castles, Joe Weatherly, Wendell Scott (NASCAR's first African-American competitor), and Cale Yarborough.

 41-Richard Petty
 11-Ned Jarrett
 87-Buck Baker
 2-Fred Harb
 99-Bobby Isaac
 6-David Pearson
 32-Tiny Lund
 05-Joe Weatherly
 X-Frank Warren
 34-Wendell Scott

Sandlapper 200

The 1963 Sandlapper 200 was the official site of Richard Petty's 25th NASCAR Grand National win for Petty Enterprises; leading 138 laps in that race. The race took place on August 8, 1963, at Columbia Speedway in Columbia, South Carolina. Two hundred laps were done on a dirt track spanning .

 43 - Richard Petty
 6 - David Pearson
 99 - Bobby Isaac
 11 - Ned Jarrett
 03 - G. C. Spencer
 5 - Billy Wade
 48 - Jack Smith
 19 - Cale Yarborough
 34 - Wendell Scott
 57 - Bobby Keck

Old Dominion 500

The 1963 Old Dominion 500 is a NASCAR Grand National Series race that took place on September 22, 1963, at Martinsville Speedway in Martinsville, Virginia, U.S.. Possum Jones and Bobby Keck were the two drivers not to qualify for this event. The race was scheduled for 500 laps; taking three hours and forty-two minutes to complete. Fred Lorenzen defeated Marvin Panch by a single lap and two seconds.

 28 - Fred Lorenzen
 21 - Marvin Panch
 8 - Joe Weatherly
 6 - David Pearson
 41 - Richard Petty
 5 - Billy Wade
 22 - Fireball Roberts
 29 - Nelson Stacy
 47 - Jack Smith
 87 - Buck Baker

Golden State 400

The 1963 Golden State 400 is a NASCAR Grand National Series racing event held on November 3, 1963, at Riverside International Raceway in the American community of Riverside, California.

Richard Petty attempted to compete using automatic transmission but his transmission failed only five laps into the race; proving that NASCAR may always be for vehicles with a four-speed T-10 manual transmission with a clutch, although in 2022, the seventh-generation Cup Series race car abandoned the H-pattern transmission in favour of a sequential gearbox. He would go on to become a replacement driver for Junior Johnson; although Johnson received credit for the fifth-place finish.

 16-Darel Dieringer
 21-Dave MacDonald
 121-Marvin Panch
 22-Fireball Roberts
 26-Junior Johnson
 47-Jack Smith
 8-Joe Weatherly
 62-Bill Amick
 18-Bob Ross
 97-Ron Hornaday Sr.

References

 Racing Reference – Daytona 500
 Racing Reference – Sandlapper 200

 

NASCAR Cup Series seasons